Mirili (also, Mirilli) is a village and municipality in the Imishli Rayon of Azerbaijan.  It has a population of 954.

References 

Populated places in Imishli District